Grimsay may refer to several islands in Scotland:
Grimsay, a tidal island north of Benbecula in the Outer Hebrides
Grimsay, South East Benbecula, a tidal island south of Benbecula in the Outer Hebrides
Graemsay, one of the Orkney Islands 

See also:
Grímsey, an island in Iceland
Grimsby, a seaport on the Humber Estuary in Lincolnshire, England
Grimsøy, a peninsula in Østfold, Norway